Santander UK plc is a British bank, wholly owned by the Spanish Santander Group. Santander UK plc manages its affairs autonomously, with its own local management team, responsible solely for its performance. 

Santander UK is one of the leading personal financial services companies in the United Kingdom, and one of the largest providers of mortgages and savings in the United Kingdom. The bank has circa 20,000 employees, 14 million active customers, 64 corporate business centres.

The bank, with its head office in  2 Triton Square, Regent's Place, London, NW1 3AN, United Kingdom, was established on 11 January 2010, when Abbey National plc was combined with the savings business and branches of Bradford & Bingley plc, and renamed Santander UK plc. Alliance & Leicester plc merged into the renamed business in May 2010.

In a March 2020 moneysavingexpert.com poll, customers satisfaction with the levels of customer service ranked Santander second among major high street banks.

In October 2011, Moody's downgraded the credit rating of twelve financial firms in the United Kingdom, including Santander UK, blaming financial weakness. In June 2012, Moody rated Santander UK as being in a more financially healthy position than its parent company, Banco Santander.  Less than 1% of Santander UK's business is held abroad.

History

Establishment

The bank has its origins in three constituent companies—Abbey National, Alliance & Leicester and Bradford & Bingley—all former mutual building societies.

Abbey National, trading as Abbey, had been bought by the Santander Group in July 2004 for £9 billion. Santander purchased Alliance & Leicester in the middle of September 2008, followed by the branches and savings business of Bradford & Bingley, which had been nationalised by HM Government during the 2008 banking crisis.

Abbey National and the savings business and branches of Bradford & Bingley were rebranded as Santander on 11 January 2010, and Abbey National plc was renamed Santander UK plc. Formula One driver Lewis Hamilton unveiled the first rebranded Santander branch that day in central London.

A further three hundred Abbey and Bradford & Bingley branches in London and south east England were rebranded that day, with branches in the rest of the United Kingdom following by the end of the month, by which time there were 1,045 Santander branches. Alliance & Leicester plc merged into the bank on 28 May 2010, and was rebranded by the end of the year.

The bank retained the London headquarters of Abbey National and renamed other regional buildings under its own name. The Abbey name was retained initially for Abbey International (now Santander Private Banking), and Abbey for Intermediaries (now Santander for Intermediaries), the division of the bank offering Abbey branded mortgages provided by Santander UK plc.

The charitable divisions of Abbey, Bradford & Bingley and Alliance & Leicester were brought together to form the Santander Foundation.

Due to the three way merger, Santander was in the unusual position of having more than one branch in many British high streets. In Northumberland Street, Newcastle upon Tyne, for example, there were three branches, which were formerly Abbey, Alliance & Leicester and Bradford & Bingley respectively.

Plymouth city centre had four branches within three hundred metres, two of which were adjacent to each other. Until December 2019, Shrewsbury had two branches of Santander in the town centre. In March 2012, the bank began to reduce the number of duplicate branches, identifying 56 that would close. Staff in the branches selected for closure were moved to other nearby branches.

Alliance & Leicester Commercial Bank merged into Santander's business banking division, Santander Corporate Banking, in July 2009.

Recent years
On 9 March 2010, Santander sold the investment and asset management business James Hay to IFG Group for £35 million. Later in the year, it was confirmed on 4 August that Santander intended to purchase the branches of The Royal Bank of Scotland in England and Wales, and the branches of NatWest in Scotland as part of a divestment of the business by The Royal Bank of Scotland Group. The deal collapsed on 12 October 2012.

Santander has frequently been rated the worst bank for customer service in the United Kingdom, although by July 2011 had sought to improve, notably by returning call centre operations to the United Kingdom from India. During 2011, the bank put aside £538m to cover claims from customers for the misselling of payment protection insurance (PPI).

In December 2012, Santander reached an agreement to sell its store card business, which includes branded cards issued for retailers including Topshop, House of Fraser and Debenhams, to SAV Credit. The sale was completed on 13 May 2013, though Santander continued to service accounts on behalf of SAV Credit until 1 April 2014.

During 2014, the bank considered an initial public offering (IPO), which was expected to be completed within two years. In November 2014, the chief executive of the Santander Group said that an IPO would not be forthcoming until market conditions improved. This view was repeated in July 2015.

In January 2019, the bank announced plans to shut 140 branches during that year, reducing the size of its branch network to 614. In March 2021 the bank announced that it intended to close a further 111 UK branches by August 2021.

Between 2021 and 2022 the majority of the Bank's back office administration was outsourced to Genpact in India.

Services

The bank provides a full range of personal, business and corporate accounts, including current accounts, mortgages, credit products and savings and investments. Santander operate online banking services, including mobile apps, and operate an internet only banking division branded Cahoot. Mortgages are also provided through Santander for Intermediaries, a division of the bank used by brokers. The bank's branches on the Isle of Man and Jersey have operated under the brand name of Santander International since 2016.

Santander's Corporate and Commercial Banking division operates from a number of regional business banking centres across the United Kingdom. In May 2013, Ana Botin announced plans to double the number of centres to 70 within three years. Santander UK is authorised by the Prudential Regulation Authority and regulated by both the Financial Conduct Authority and the Prudential Regulation Authority.

It is a member of the Financial Services Compensation Scheme, UK Payments Administration, Bankers' Automated Clearing Services (BACS), the Faster Payments Service, the Clearing House Automated Payment System (CHAPS), the Cheque and Credit Clearing Company, the British Bankers' Association and subscribes to the Lending Code.

Six digit account sort codes are used in the range between 09-00-xx to 09-19-xx. Sort codes for accounts formerly held by Alliance & Leicester use the range 09-01-31 to 09-01-36.

In November 2009, Santander launched the first current account in the United Kingdom without fees (including unauthorised overdrafts) for its current and future mortgage customers. In January 2010, the bank began waiving fees for customers using Santander's automated teller machines in Spain, which traditionally would incur fees for transactions in a foreign currency.

Sponsorships & brand ambassadors

Santander has sponsored the McLaren Formula One team since 2007. Santander said its sponsorship of McLaren had raised its brand awareness in the United Kingdom from 20 to 82 percent. The bank announced a second team sponsorship, with Scuderia Ferrari, in 2009.

Golfer Rory McIlroy signed a sponsorship agreement with the bank in September 2011, and in February 2013, it was announced that British heptathlete Jessica Ennis-Hill would become a brand ambassador.

In June 2019, TV presenters Ant & Dec were announced as new brand ambassadors, appearing frequently in their television advertising campaigns. 

In February 2015, Santander was announced as the new sponsor of Transport for London's bicycle hire scheme, branded as Santander Cycles. Santander replaced Barclays as title sponsor. Santander also sponsors other bicycle hire schemes in Leicester and Milton Keynes.

See also

Banking in the United Kingdom
List of banks in the United Kingdom

References

External links

 
 Santander Corporate and Commercial Banking
 Santander International
 Santander Foundation

Banks of the United Kingdom
Banks established in 2010
Banco Santander
2010 establishments in the United Kingdom
British subsidiaries of foreign companies
Companies based in the London Borough of Camden